Welega may refer to:
 Welega Oromo
 Welega language
 Welega Province
 Kelem Welega Zone in the Oromia Region.
 Mirab (West) Welega Zone in the Oromia Region.
 Misraq (East) Welega Zone in the Oromia Region.